John Michael Macdonald (May 3, 1906 – June 20, 1997) was a Canadian politician.

Early life
Born in North Sydney, Nova Scotia, the son of Joseph Macdonald and Theresa MacDonald, he was educated at St. Francis Xavier University and Dalhousie University. He was called to the Nova Scotia bar in 1945.

Career
He practised law with his father and with Ronald J. Macdonald. During World War II, Macdonald served with the Royal Canadian Electrical and Mechanical Engineers and with the Royal Canadian Ordnance Corps.

He ran unsuccessfully as the National Government candidate (the label used by the Conservative Party/Progressive Conservative Party during those elections) for the House of Commons of Canada in the riding of Cape Breton North and Victoria in the 1940 election and 1945 election. In 1956, he was elected to the Nova Scotia House of Assembly, representing the electoral district of Cape Breton North.

As Senator
Summoned to the Senate of Canada in 1960 representing the senatorial division of Cape Breton, Nova Scotia, a Progressive Conservative, he was twice Opposition Whip in the Senate (1963–1979 and 1980–1984) and was Government Whip in the Senate (1979–1980). He was the last senator to serve in the senate past the age of 75, and one of the last senators appointed for life serving in the Senate (Orville Howard Phillips was the last senator with a lifetime appointment. He resigned in 1999).

Death
Macdonald died in North Sydney, Nova Scotia in 1997;

References

External links

1906 births
1997 deaths
Canadian senators from Nova Scotia
Canadian people of Scottish descent
Conservative Party of Canada (1867–1942) candidates for the Canadian House of Commons
Progressive Conservative Party of Canada candidates for the Canadian House of Commons
Candidates in the 1945 Canadian federal election
Progressive Conservative Association of Nova Scotia MLAs
Dalhousie University alumni
People from North Sydney, Nova Scotia
St. Francis Xavier University alumni